The 2018 Championnat de France FFSA GT - French GT4 Cup was the twenty-first season of the French FFSA GT Championship and the first as the French GT4 Cup, a sports car championship created and organised by the Stéphane Ratel Organisation (SRO). The season began on 1 April in Nogaro and ended on 14 October at Paul Ricard.

Calendar			
At the annual press conference during the 2017 24 Hours of Spa on 28 July, the Stéphane Ratel Organisation announced the first draft of the 2018 calendar. No changes were made to the schedule compared to 2017. The finalised calendar confirmed the races in Pau were moved one week earlier and it confirmed the dates of the races at Dijon-Prenois.

Entry list

Race results			
Bold indicates overall winner.

Championship standings			
Scoring system			
Championship points were awarded for the first ten positions in each race. Entries were required to complete 75% of the winning car's race distance in order to be classified and earn points. Individual drivers were required to participate for a minimum of 25 minutes in order to earn championship points in any race.

Drivers' championship

Teams' championship

See also			
2018 GT4 European Series			
2018 GT4 Central European Cup

Notes

References

External links			
			
			

			
GT4 European Series			
French GT4 Cup